Benkankatti is a village in Dharwad district of Karnataka, India.

Demographics
As of the 2011 Census of India there were 259 households in Benkankatti and a total population of 1,580 consisting of 814 males and 766 females. There were 234 children ages 0-6.

References

Villages in Dharwad district